Obliging Young Lady is a 1942 American romantic comedy film directed by Richard Wallace and starring Joan Carroll, Edmond O'Brien, Ruth Warrick.

Plot
On the instructions of their lawyer, the wealthy young daughter of divorcing parents (Joan Carroll) is removed to a mountain resort, complete with a decoy mother, to protect her from the publicity.  The situation is immediately complicated by persistent reporters, a romantic interest for the fake mother, and a convention of birdwatchers.

Cast 

 Joan Carroll as Bridget Potter
 Edmond O'Brien as "Red" Reddy
 Ruth Warrick as Linda Norton
 Eve Arden as "Space" O'Shea
 Robert Smith as Charles Baker
 Franklin Pangborn as Professor Gibney
 Marjorie Gateson as Mira Potter
 John Miljan as George Potter
 George Cleveland as Lodge Manager
 Luis Alberni as Riccardi
 Charles Lane as Detective
 Fortunio Bonanova as Chef
 Andrew Tombes as Conductor
 Almira Sessions as Maid
 Pierre Watkin as Markham
 Florence Gill as Miss Hollyrod
 Sidney Blackmer as Attorney
 Jed Prouty as Judge Rufus
 George Chandler as Skip
 Emory Parnell as Motorcycle Policeman

Reception
The film lost $118,000 at the box office.

References

External links 
 

1942 films
American black-and-white films
Films scored by Roy Webb
Films directed by Richard Wallace
1942 romantic comedy films
American romantic comedy films
1940s English-language films
1940s American films
English-language romantic comedy films